Vaughanites is a genus of m predatory sea snails, marine gastropod mollusks in the family Pyramimitridae .

Species
 † Vaughanites leptus Woodring, 1928
 Vaughanites superstes Kantor, Lozouet, Puillandre & Bouchet, 2014

Description
The shell is medium-sized, very slender, Mitra-like. The protoconch consists of between two and three whorls, about the last one sculptured with coarse axial riblets. The aperture is long and narrow. The siphonal canal is very long and narrow, unemarginate. The anal notch, according to growth lines and ribs, is rather wide and shallow, the apex lying on a prominent spiral some distance from suture. The columella bears two strong Mitra-like folds. The sculpture consists of strong axial and spiral cords, forming an open lattice-work.

References

External links
  Woodring, W. P. (1928). Miocene mollusks from Bowden, Jamaica. 2. Gastropods and discussion of results. Carnegie Institution of Washington Publication. 385: vii + 564 pp., 40 pls

Pyramimitridae